Helen Housby (born 19 January 1995 in Stockport, Manchester) is a professional English netball player.
She played for the Superleague side Manchester Thunder from 2013 to 2016, helping them win the 2014 Superleague Grand-Final against rivals Surrey Storm. As of 2018 she plays for the New South Wales Swifts.

Housby was a member of the England national netball team that played at the 2014 Commonwealth Games and 2015 Netball World Cup.

She was a key member of the England netball team that won the gold medal match against Australia at the 2018 Commonwealth Games in Gold Coast, Australia - scoring in the final second of the game to give victory to England by one point. The England team had beaten Jamaica in the semi-final match by a single point, also from a last-minute goal. Jamaica had narrowly defeated England in Glasgow 2014 to take the bronze medal.

By the time she was selected in the final 12-player squad for England's 2019 Netball World Cup campaign, she had 58 caps to her name.

Housby has completed two years of her zoology degree course at the University of Manchester.

References

Living people
1995 births
English netball players
Netball players at the 2014 Commonwealth Games
Netball Superleague players
Netball players at the 2018 Commonwealth Games
New South Wales Swifts players
Commonwealth Games gold medallists for England
Commonwealth Games medallists in netball
2019 Netball World Cup players
English expatriate netball people in Australia
Manchester Thunder players
2015 Netball World Cup players
Netball players at the 2022 Commonwealth Games
Medallists at the 2018 Commonwealth Games